The 1943 edition of the Campeonato Carioca kicked off on June 13, 1943 and ended on October 10, 1943. It was organized by FMF (Federação Metropolitana de Futebol, or Metropolitan Football Federation). Ten teams participated. Flamengo won the title for the 9th time. no teams were relegated.

System
The tournament would be disputed in a double round-robin format, with the team with the most points winning the title.

With the championship how having two rounds instead of the previous year's three, two pre-season tournaments were set up to fill the gap in the clubs' schedules. The first was the Torneio Relâmpago, which would be played by the five 'big' teams, in a single-round robin system. the other, which would be disputed after the Torneio Relâmpago, was the Torneio Municipal, which would be disputed by all the ten league teams, in a single round-robin format. Both tournaments would be short-lived - the Torneio Relâmpago had its last edition in 1946, being cancelled as Olaria's entrance into the league in 1947 made the additional dates provided by it unnecessary. In turn, the Torneio Municipal would be discontinued after 1948, with only one more isolated edition being held in 1951.

Torneio Relâmpago

Torneio Municipal

Championship

Top Scores

References

Campeonato Carioca seasons
Carioca